Rick Turner may refer to:

 Rick Turner (luthier) (1943–2022), American builder of guitars and basses
 Rick Turner (philosopher) (1942–1978), South African philosopher allegedly assassinated by the apartheid state
 Rick Turner (baseball) (born 1959), baseball executive
 Rick Turner (archaeologist) (1952–2018), British archaeologist